Josef Moser may refer to:

 Josef Moser (cyclist) (born 1917), Austrian Olympic cyclist
 Josef Moser (jurist) (born 1955), Austrian lawyer and politician
 Josef Moser (entomologist) (1861–1944), Austrian entomologist